Malene Schwartz (born 10 August 1936) is a Danish film actress. She has appeared in more than 60 films and television shows since 1955. In the TV series Matador she played the role of Maude Varnæs. She was born in Frederiksberg, Denmark.

Partial filmography

 Hvorfor stjæler barnet? (1955)
 A Little Nest (1956)- Christl
 Den kloge mand (1956)
 Natlogi betalt (1957) - Inga
 Englen i sort (1957) - Sygeplejerske
 Det lille hotel (1958) - Marianne
 Soldaterkammerater (1958) - Ellens stemme (voice, uncredited)
 Parasitterne (1958, TV Movie) - Gudrun
 Sjove år, De (1959) - Lene
 Komtessen (1961) - Betina Mortensen
 Min kone fra Paris (1961) - Kirsten Dreyer
 Jetpiloter (1961) - Lise Jessen
 Sorte Shara (1961) - Chefens kone
 Landsbylægen (1961) - Anne-Mette Krogh
 Duellen (1962) - Tina
 Prinsesse for en dag (1962) - Mette Jansen
 Den rige enke (1962) - Grete Ellekjær
 Venus fra Vestø (1962) - Nicola Egede-Schack
 Drømmen om det hvide slot (1962) - Susanne Strand
 Frøken April (1963) - Frk. April Bergen
 Frøken Nitouche (1963) - Corinna
 Bussen (1963) - Else
 Slottet (1964) - Bente Falke
 Eurydike (1964, TV Movie) - Eurydike
  (1965) - Jeanette
 Pigen og millionæren (1965)
 Jag - en kvinna (1965) - Britta
 Tre små piger (1966) - Marie
 Pigen og greven (1966) - Irene Gyvelstjerne
 Copenhagen Design (1967, TV Short)
 Min kones ferie (1967) - Antikvitetshandlerske Tenna
 En spurv i tranedans (1968, TV Movie) - Louise
 Jeg elsker blåt (1968) - Gerd
 Ægteskabet mellem lyst og nød (1975, TV Movie) - Babette
 Tro, håb og kærlighed (1984) - Kirsten's mother
 Mors dag (1996, TV Movie) - Margit
 Arsenik og gamle kniplinger (2002, TV Movie) - Martha Brewster
 Dykkerdrengen (2003, Short) - Farmor
 Reconstruction (2003) - Fru Banum (Mrs. Banum)
 Flammen & Citronen (2008) - Gilbert's Kone

References

External links

1936 births
Living people
Danish film actresses
People from Frederiksberg
Danish television actresses
20th-century Danish actresses
21st-century Danish actresses